Morningside Manor is a suburb of Johannesburg, South Africa. It is located in Johannesburg Region E.

References

Johannesburg Region E